Lannoy is a commune in the Nord department in northern France.

Heraldry

Geography
With a land area of only , it is the fourth-smallest French commune (after Castelmoron-d'Albret, Plessix-Balisson, and Vaudherland) by surface area. It also has the highest density of population of any commune outside of the Île-de-France region, slightly greater than that of the city of Lyon.

People
Jean Piat, actor and writer

The de Lannoy family and the Delano family are both named from the town of Lannoy.

See also
Communes of the Nord department

References

External links

Ville de Lannoy Official website

Communes of Nord (French department)
French Flanders